"Espérame" is a pop song recorded by Chilean singer and actress Denise Rosenthal and this song is the second single for her first solo studio album, El Blog de la Feña, released in Chile on August 11, 2008. The song was written by Gonzalo Yañez, Arturo Fontaine and Hector Fontaine and recorded in Chile.

Music video
The music video for this song was directed by Juan Pablo Sanchez in Santiago, Chile. It premiered on Canal 13 in August 2008. The video shows Rosenthal in many different faces.

References

External links
 
 Denise Rosenthal official Music My Space

2008 singles
Denise Rosenthal songs
Songs written by Gonzalo Yañez
2008 songs